Joseph Bennett may refer to:

Joseph Bennett (actor) (1894–1931), American actor
Joseph Bennett (billiards player) (1842–1905), English champion player of English billiards
Joseph Bennett (British politician) (1829–1908), English merchant and Liberal Party politician
Joseph Bennett (cricketer, born 1835) (1835–1879), New Zealand cricketer
Joseph Bennett (cricketer, born 1881) (1881–1947), New Zealand cricketer
Joseph Bennett (critic) (1831–1911), English music critic and librettist
Joseph Bennett (footballer), English footballer
Joseph Bennett (Victoria cricketer), Australian cricketer
Joseph A. Bennett (1968–2015), English actor
Joseph B. Bennett (1859–1923), U.S. congressman
Joseph Bray Bennett (1833–1913), English American politician in Wisconsin
Joseph L. Bennett (died 1848), Texas legislator, Lt. Colonel (Battle of San Jacinto)

See also
Joe Bennett (disambiguation)
Joseph Bennet (1629–1707), English minister and theologian
Josephine Bennett (1880–1961), American suffragist and activist